Jordan Nathaniel Marcel Knight (born May 17, 1970) is an American singer-songwriter and actor. He is the lead vocalist of the boy band New Kids on the Block (NKOTB), which rose to fame in the 1980s and 1990s, using a falsetto style of singing influenced by The Stylistics. After New Kids on the Block split in 1994, he launched a solo career. 

Knight's first solo album, released in 1999, and his latest solo album, released in 2011, reached the Top 50 on the U.S. Billboard 200. As of 2011, he released four Top 40 singles; the best known being "Give It to You" in 1999. Knight has released three solo albums, one remix album and one EP. On May 31, 2011, Knight released the studio album, Unfinished. Knight has sold over 1.5 million records worldwide as a solo artist.

Early life and career
Jordan Nathaniel Marcel Knight was born in Worcester, Massachusetts, but holds American and Canadian citizenship. His parents are Canadian, his father is from Meaford, Ontario and his mother is from Dunnville, Ontario. He is the youngest of 6 children: Allison, Sharon, David, Christopher, and Jonathan. His father is an Episcopal priest.

Before fame, he played in a youth baseball league in Dorchester, Massachusetts.

Jordan was almost 14 years old in 1984 when he joined New Kids on the Block, a band assembled in Boston by producer Maurice Starr. His fellow members included his brother Jonathan Knight, as well as Joey McIntyre, Donnie Wahlberg, and Danny Wood. Over the next few years, he began writing songs and teaching himself piano and keyboard instruments. Starr, who wrote much of the New Kids material, was reluctant to add his work to the band's repertoire.

New Kids on the Block have sold over 80 million records worldwide, generated hundreds of million of dollars in concert revenues and paved the way for later boy bands like Backstreet Boys and *NSYNC. New Kids on the Block disbanded in 1994, but reunited in 2008.

Solo career
Knight made a comeback in 1999 by releasing his first solo single, "Give It To You." The single reached No. 10 on the Billboard Hot 100, went gold, and was nominated for the 1999 MTV Video Music Award for Best Dance Video, though it lost to Ricky Martin's "Livin' La Vida Loca." He was also nominated for Favorite Male Singer at the 2000 Kids' Choice Awards. The single also peaked at No. 35 on the Hot Dance Music/Club Play chart. The album Jordan Knight won an Aspire Music Award for Best Male Album (Pop). Knight's self-titled debut album was then certified gold for sales of over 500,000 copies in the US on July 7, 1999. The album peaked at No. 29 on the Billboard 200 and No. 9 on the Top Internet Albums chart. In 2008, the New Kids on the Block reunited and released 2 top 40 hits and went on a successful tour. In the fall of 2010, they teamed with the Backstreet Boys (BSB), creating the boy band NKOTBSB, and toured in summer 2011.

Knight released a remix album, Jordan Knight Performs New Kids on the Block: The Remix Album, in 2004.

In 2005, Knight released an EP titled The Fix supported by the lead single "Where Is Your Heart Tonight," which reached its peak at No. 12 on the Billboard Adult Contemporary chart. He continued to tour extensively in 2005–2006 promoting the EP.

In September 2006, Knight's next album, Love Songs, was released by Transcontinental Records. The first single was "Say Goodbye," a duet with Deborah Gibson, that peaked at No. 24 on the Billboard Adult Contemporary chart.

On May 31, 2011, Knight released his third solo album, Unfinished. The album reached No. 8 on the US Billboard Independent Albums chart, No. 48 on the US Billboard 200 and No. 55 in Canada. He announced began his Live and Unfinished Tour on December 11, 2011. Knight performed the announced dates with Boston-based band Elevation Theory.

In 2014, Knight teamed up with Nick Carter for the release of the album Nick & Knight. The duo toured throughout the fall of that year in support of the album.

Restaurant partnership
In 2016, Knight became a partner in an Italian restaurant called Novara in Milton, Massachusetts.

Television
Knight was a judge on the American Idol spin-off, American Juniors. He was a third-season cast member on the VH1 reality television series The Surreal Life with other celebrities in 2004. He later appeared in the 2007 spin-off The Surreal Life: Fame Games.

In 2005, Knight appeared on the British show Hit Me Baby One More Time, where he performed "Give It to You," as well as a cover of "Let Me Love You" by Mario.

In September 2005, Knight also starred in a British documentary on Five in the UK called Trust Me – I'm a Holiday Rep. Six celebrities spent 10 days in the role of an Olympic Holidays holiday rep in Ayia Napa, Cyprus.

Knight also appeared on the game show Identity, hosted by Penn Jillette. In September 2011, he featured as a judge on the CBC show Cover Me Canada.

Personal life
Knight has been married to Evelyn Melendez since 2004.  They have two sons. Knight lives in Milton, Massachusetts.

Discography

Solo albums
 Jordan Knight (1999)
Jordan Knight Performs New Kids on the Block: The Remix Album (2004)
 Love Songs (2006) 
 Unfinished (2011)

Collaborative albums
 Nick & Knight (2014, with Nick Carter)

References

External links
 

1970 births
Living people
20th-century American singers
21st-century American male actors
21st-century American singers
American child singers
American contemporary R&B singers
American dance musicians
American male pop singers
American male singers
American male songwriters
American male television actors
American people of Canadian descent
Countertenors
English High School of Boston alumni
Interscope Records artists
Male actors from Boston
Male actors from Worcester, Massachusetts
Musicians from Boston
Musicians from Worcester, Massachusetts
Naturalized citizens of Canada
New Kids on the Block members
NKOTBSB members
People from Dorchester, Massachusetts
People from Milton, Massachusetts
Record producers from Massachusetts
Singers from Massachusetts
Songwriters from Massachusetts